John Thomas Dicks (1818–1881) was a publisher in London in the 19th century. He issued popular, affordably priced fiction and drama, such as "shilling Shakespeares and wonderfully cheap reprints of Scott and other standard authors." Earlier in his career he worked with Peter Perring Thoms and George W. M. Reynolds. Employees included illustrator Frederick Gilbert. Readers included Thomas Burt and Havelock Ellis. Dicks retired in the 1870s, when his sons took over the firm which continued into the 1960s.

Works issued by John Dicks
  (sheet music series); numbered list

Drama
 
  (series)

Dicks' Standard Plays
  (series)
  – arranged by number, title, author (Ainsworth, Dickens, Lytton, Scott, etc.), and theme (nautical, dumb hero, ghost, Irish, Scotch, military, temperance, fairy, equestrian, etc.)

Fiction
 
  (series); numbered list
  (series).
 Dicks' English Library of Standard Works, v.33 (via British Library on Flickr)
 WorldCat. Dicks' English Library of Standard Works (series)
  (series); numbered list

Periodicals

  – authors included George Manville Fenn, George Augustus Sala
 Fashion plate, 1865
 Fashion plates, 1870s
 Reynolds' Miscellany
 Halfpenny Gazette, 1861–1865
 Every Week, 1869–1896
 Penny Illustrated Weekly News
 Fiction, edited by Eliza Winstanley – weekly

Catalogues

References

Further reading
 
 
 
 
 Waterloo Directory of English Newspapers and Periodicals

External links

 
 

1818 births
1881 deaths
Publishers (people) from London
19th-century English businesspeople